Torsin family 3 member A is a protein that in humans is encoded by the TOR3A gene.

References

Further reading